Kelly Berry Nabong (born November 17, 1988) is a Filipino-American basketball player who last played for the Blackwater Bossing of the Philippine Basketball Association (PBA). He was selected 17th overall in the 2012 PBA draft by the Rain or Shine Elasto Painters. He would be later traded to the Meralco Bolts on draft night.

Professional career

He was traded to GlobalPort as part of the Sol Mercado deal between Meralco and the GlobalPort.

On September 4, 2013, he was involved in a brawl in a game against San Mig Coffee Mixers. The scuffle ensued after teammate Marvin Hayes and San Mig import Marqus Blakely got tangled up. Blakely's teammate Joe Devance shoved Hayes down on the floor, then he pushed Blakely. Marc Pingris came into the scene and exchanged blows with him.  He and Pingris were both suspended for two games and fined P60,000 each.

In May 2015, Nabong was traded by GlobalPort back to Meralco for John Wilson. The latter was later traded to NLEX Road Warriors for a 2016 second-round pick.

On June 21, 2018, Nabong was traded to the San Miguel Beermen for Gabby Espinas and SMB's 2020 second-round draft pick.

In January 2020, Nabong was traded back to NorthPort Batang Pier for Russel Escoto.

PBA career statistics

As of the end of 2021 season

Season-by-season averages

|-
| align=left | 
| align=left | Meralco / GlobalPort
| 20 || 14.0 || .507 || .600 || .690 || 4.2 || .3 || .5 || .2 || 4.6
|-
| align=left | 
| align=left | GlobalPort
| 21 || 18.2 || .394 || .000 || .824 || 5.5 || .8 || .6 || .2 || 5.4
|-
| align=left | 
| align=left | GlobalPort / Meralco
| 23 || 15.6 || .476 || .000 || .842 || 4.2 || .7 || .4 || .2 || 4.2
|-
| align=left | 
| align="left" rowspan="2" | Meralco
| 40 || 14.1 || .493 || .250 || .767 || 3.9 || .5 || .3 || .2 || 4.6
|-
| align=left | 
| 36 || 14.8 || .481 || .286 || .833 || 3.9 || .5 || .3 || .3 || 4.4
|-
| align=left | 
| align=left | GlobalPort / San Miguel
| 43 || 21.5 || .428 || .317 || .719 || 5.5 || 1.2 || .6 || .7 || 8.3
|-
| align=left | 
| align=left | San Miguel
| 40 || 10.9 || .385 || .318 || .576 || 2.4 || .6 || .4 || .3 || 3.3
|-
| align=left | 
| align=left | NorthPort
| 11 || 24.6 || .404 || .283 || .750 || 5.2 || 1.5 || .4 || .4 || 11.5
|-
| align=left | 
| align=left | Blackwater
| 8|| 29.3 || .361 || .212 || .613 || 8.3 || 1.3 || 1.0 || .9 || 10.8
|-class=sortbottom
| align=center colspan=2 | Career
| 242 || 16.5 || .436 || .302 || .733 || 4.3 || .8 || .4 || .3 || 5.6

References

1988 births
Living people
American men's basketball players
American sportspeople of Filipino descent
Basketball players from Sacramento, California
Centers (basketball)
Filipino men's basketball players
Junior college men's basketball players in the United States
Meralco Bolts players
NorthPort Batang Pier players
Power forwards (basketball)
Rain or Shine Elasto Painters draft picks
San Miguel Beermen players
Blackwater Bossing players
Citizens of the Philippines through descent